Sabrina Tasselli (born 3 April 1990) is an Italian footballer who plays as a goalkeeper for Serie A club Napoli. She has made multiple appearances for the Italy national team.

Club career
Tasselli plays as a goalkeeper. From 2009 to 2011, Tasselli played for Reggiana. She was part of the Reggiana squad that won the 2010 Coppa Italia, though she did not play in the final. She then played for Tavagnacco, Bardolino Verona and Riviera di Romagna. 

In 2016, she played for Icelandic club Stjarnan, who won the 2016 Úrvalsdeild kvenna. In September 2016, she returned to Italy to play for Reggiana. In the 2016–17 season, Reggiana won , and were promoted to Serie A. From 2017 to 2019, Tasselli played for Sassuolo, and in 2019, she signed for Juventus. In July 2020, she signed a one-year contract extension, and whilst she was at Juventus, they won the 2019–20 Serie A and the 2020 Supercoppa Italiana. In January 2021, Tasselli signed for Napoli, on a contract until the end of the 2020–21 season. She made her Napoli debut in March 2021, as regular goalkeeper Catalina Pérez was injured. In July 2021, Tasselli signed for Fiorentina. In July 2022, Tasselli re-signed for Napoli.

International career
Tasselli received her maiden call to the Italy women's national football team for the 2015 Cyprus Women's Cup. Later that year, she made her debut for Italy, in a friendly match against China. She played in Italy's 2016 Cyprus Women's Cup match against the Republic of Ireland, and was in the squad for the 2017 Cyprus Women's Cup.

Honours
Juventus
 Serie A: 2020–21

Notes

References

External links
 

1990 births
Living people
Italy women's international footballers
Italian expatriate women's footballers
Italian expatriate sportspeople in Iceland
Stjarnan women's football players
A.S.D. Reggiana Calcio Femminile players
U.P.C. Tavagnacco players
S.S.D. Napoli Femminile players
Juventus F.C. (women) players
U.S. Sassuolo Calcio (women) players
Sportspeople from Carpi, Emilia-Romagna
Italian women's footballers
Expatriate women's footballers in Iceland
Women's association football goalkeepers
Footballers from Emilia-Romagna